Päidla Lake District is located in Valga County, Estonia. It consists of 11 lakes. Total area of lakes is 1,4 km2.

These lakes are eutrophic.

Lakes 
Kalmejärv
Mõrtsuka Lake 
Näkijärv
Nõuni Lake 
Päidla Ahvenjärv
Päidla Kõverjärv
Päidla Mõisajärv
Päidla Mudajärv
Päidla Uibujärv
Päidla Väikejärv
Räbi Lake
Väike-Nõuni Lake

References